Colla klagesi is a moth in the Bombycidae family. It was described by Warren in 1901, and originally placed in its own genus, Agriochlora, which has since been synonymized. It is found in Venezuela.

References

Natural History Museum Lepidoptera generic names catalog

Bombycidae
Moths described in 1901